Elias Zana; born December 30, 1990) is an Israeli footballer who plays in Ironi Tiberias.

He made his debut in Maccabi Netanya in a Toto Cup fixture against Bnei Yehuda.

External links
 
 

1990 births
Israeli Jews
Living people
Israeli footballers
Maccabi Netanya F.C. players
Hapoel Hadera F.C. players
Hapoel Daliyat al-Karmel F.C. players
Ihud Bnei Majd al-Krum F.C. players
Hapoel Kfar Shalem F.C. players
Hapoel Iksal F.C. players
Ironi Tiberias F.C. players
Footballers from Hadera
Israeli people of Ethiopian-Jewish descent
Sportspeople of Ethiopian descent
Association football defenders